Loraine Rollins was an American politician who served in the Wyoming House of Representatives in 1927.

References

Year of birth missing
Year of death missing
Members of the Wyoming House of Representatives
Women state legislators in Wyoming
20th-century American women politicians
People from Wyoming
20th-century American politicians